Matija Mazarek or Matija Masarek (1726– 1792) was an 18th-century Catholic priest. In the second half of the 18th century he was the archbishop of the Roman Catholic Diocese of Skopje. His reports to the Vatican are an important source for demography study of his diocese.

Origin 
Of Albanian origin, Mazarek was born in Janjevo in 1726. Noel Malcolm believes that they were Albanians who absorbed Serbian and forgot the Albanian language. The basis for his position are toponyms in Malësia (region of northern Albania and southern Montenegro). Elsie links the name to Mazreku, an Albanian tribe north of Shkodër. The name Mazrek(u), which means horse breeder in Albanian, is found throughout all Albanian regions. Mazrek is also the name of an Albanian village in Kosovo recorded in 1452

Career 

Before 1743, Jovan Nikolović (or Gjon Nikolle) sent Mazarek to Italy to be trained for his religious tasks. In 1750 he was archbishop of the Roman Catholic Diocese of Skopje.

Many of his ancestors and descendants were notable Catholic priests, such as:
 Pjeter Mazarek, 17th-century archbishop of the Roman Catholic Archdiocese of Bar
 Josip Mazarek, his brother, a Catholic priest.

Reports 

He wrote notable reports to Vatican during the second half of the 18th century. Those reports include description about migrations of people from Malësia (region now divided by Montenegro and Albania) to region he referred to as Serbia (modern-day Kosovo). In 1792 he reported that villages around Đakovica received influx of Catholics from Albania.

His reports include many complaints about Albanians who arrived from Malesia. His prayers included "Ab albanensibus libera nos Domine".

References

Sources 

 
 

1726 births
Year of death unknown
18th-century Roman Catholic bishops in the Ottoman Empire
Bishops of Skopje
15th-century Albanian Roman Catholic priests
15th-century Albanian people